Street Sweeper Social Club is the debut self-titled album by American rap rock supergroup Street Sweeper Social Club, composed of guitarist Tom Morello of Rage Against the Machine and Audioslave and rapper/emcee Boots Riley of The Coup. The album was released by Warner Music Group on June 16, 2009.

The first single from the album, entitled "100 Little Curses", premiered on the band's Myspace on April 27, 2009.

Two additional songs from the album: "Clap for the Killers" and "The Oath" were released on the NINJA 2009 Tour Sampler, the EP sampler supporting the 2009 NIN|JA tour with Nine Inch Nails and Jane's Addiction.

Morello describes the album as "revolutionary party jams. It's got huge steamroller riffs combined with depth, charge, funk, while Boots unloads clip after clip of incendiary rhymes rich with satire and venom." Boots Riley added that "this is a time when the working class is being fleeced left and right. More families will be homeless and more people will be jobless. They'll need something to listen to on their iPods while storming Wall Street."

To support the release of the album, the band was confirmed as the opener for the Nine Inch Nails & Jane's Addiction 2009 tour, running from the 8th of May to the 12th of June.

On September 29, 2009, Tom Morello confirmed that "Promenade" was going to be a single via YouTube.

Track listing
All tracks written by Tom Morello and Boots Riley, except where noted.

Personnel
Tom Morello - guitars, bass, background vocals
Boots Riley - vocals, lyrics
Stanton Moore - drums, percussion

Additional personnel
Eric Gardner - additional drums on 100 Little Curses
Steve Perry - background vocals on Promenade
Dave Gibbs, Carl Restivo, Eric Gardner, Jim Scott, Trevor Welch - additional background vocals
Jim Scott - recording and mixing at PLYRZ Studio, Santa Clarita, CA
Kevin Dean - assistant engineer
Thom Russo - additional engineering at NRG Recording Studios, North Hollywood, CA
Stephen Marcussen - mastering at Stephen Marcussen Mastering, Hollywood, CA

Chart performance

References

2009 debut albums
Street Sweeper Social Club albums